Hugo Valentin (1888–1963) was a Swedish historian, scholar and leading Zionist. He received his PhD from Uppsala University in 1916 and took up teaching at the Teachers Training College in Uppsala and at a high school. In 1930 he was appointed lecturer at the high school in Uppsala (Uppsala Högre Allmänna Läroverk). In 1930 he was also awarded the title of Docent by the university, and, some years later, in 1948, the government awarded him the honorary title of professor.

He is known, to scholars of Antisemitism and the history of Jews in Sweden, for his significant work, part of which  has been translated into English.

In October 1942 he wrote a well-documented article on the Holocaust in the respected and influential daily newspaper Göteborgs Handels- och Sjöfartstidning. Based on available data he claimed that the Nazis had murdered 700,000 Jews in Poland. The article was widely quoted in Sweden. From 1951 Valentin edited a cultural magazine entitled Judisk Tidskrift.

The Hugo Valentin Centre is named after the Swedish historian and is an inter-disciplinary forum at Uppsala University with research as its prime task. Research is carried out within two prioritized areas: on the one hand cultural and social phenomena and processes of change related to the ethnic dimension in human life, on the other hand the Holocaust and other cases of genocide and severe crimes against human rights. To these subject fields belong minority studies and Holocaust and genocide studies as well as related and adjacent subjects where the Centre has a marked specialisation: Holocaust history, massive violence, discrimination, multilingualism, migration and integration. Conditions in the Nordic countries and in the Balkans have a special position, and culture, language, history and religion are natural points of departure for the Centre's work.

The Centre's activities encompass research, education at post-graduate level, documentation and information. In addition to its own research, the Centre also is explicitly charged with the task of stimulating and initiating studies of its subject areas within Uppsala University. The Centre also has the task of disseminating knowledge about the areas' research problems and research results in the light of international and global perspectives, discussions and conditions. Against the backdrop of its tasks and focus, the Centre should constitute a resource for education at Uppsala University, primarily on the higher levels.

The Hugo Valentin Centre was established at Uppsala University's Faculty of Arts in November 2009 through a merging of two previous units, the Centre for Multiethnic Research and The Uppsala Programme for Holocaust and Genocide Studies. The new unit started its work under the new name on 1 January 2010.

Works
Antisemitism i historisk och kritisk belysning (1936)
Antisemitism Historically and Critically Examined
trans. from Swedish by A. G. Chater
(New York: The Viking Press, 1937)
(Freeport, NY: Books for Libraries Press, 1971)

References

External links
Sweden-Israel Friendship Association

20th-century Swedish historians
1888 births
1963 deaths
Academic staff of the University of Gothenburg
Swedish Jews
Swedish magazine editors
Uppsala University alumni